Émile Pierre-Marie van Ermengem (1851–1932) was a Belgian bacteriologist who, in 1895, isolated Clostridium botulinum, the bacterium that causes botulism, from a piece of ham that had poisoned thirty-four people.

Life
Van Ermengem was born in Leuven on 15 August 1851. After studying in Berlin he became a professor at the University of Ghent. He became a corresponding member of the Académie royale de médecine de Belgique in 1887 and a full member in 1902, serving as secretary 1919–1932.

He died in Ghent on 29 September 1932. His sons were the writer Franz Hellens and the art critic François Maret.

References

Bibliography

External links
 

1851 births
1932 deaths
Belgian bacteriologists
Belgian microbiologists